Maurice, Prince Palatine of the Rhine KG (16 January 1621, in Küstrin Castle, Brandenburg – September 1652, near the Virgin Islands), was the fourth son of Frederick V, Elector Palatine and Princess Elizabeth, only daughter of King James VI and I and Anne of Denmark.

He accompanied his elder brother, Prince Rupert of the Rhine, to take the part of their uncle Charles I in the English Civil War in 1642.  He served under Rupert with the cavalry at the Battle of Powick Bridge, where he was wounded, and the Battle of Edgehill. He commanded the army in Gloucestershire which engaged Sir William Waller in several battles in 1643, including the victory of Ripple Field (13 April), culminating in the Royalist victory at the Battle of Roundway Down (13 July). He took command of the army in Cornwall and campaigned in the southwest for the remainder of the year.

In April 1644, he besieged Lyme Regis, but was forced to give up the siege in June, at considerable cost to his military reputation. He fought as a subordinate at the Battle of Lostwithiel and the Second Battle of Newbury, and under Rupert at the Battle of Naseby.

He attempted to defend Rupert's surrender of Bristol in 1645 to Charles. While unsuccessful, he did not share in Rupert's disgrace. Banished with Rupert in October 1646, he served with the French army in Flanders, but rejoined Rupert in 1648 as vice-admiral of his fleet. He was created a Knight of the Garter in exile in 1649. In 1652, while sailing for the West Indies, he was caught in a hurricane near the Virgin Islands and went down with his flagship, HMS Defiance.

Portrayal in fiction
He is a minor character in Lawrence Norfolk's historical novel John Saturnall's Feast, published on 13 September 2012 by Bloomsbury Publishing. He also appears as a minor character in Minette Walters' novel The Swift & the Harrier (published November 2021).

External links
 
English Civil War

Royal Navy admirals
Knights of the Garter
Maurice von Simmern
People lost at sea
1620 births
1652 deaths
Deaths in tropical cyclones
Counts Palatine of the Rhine
Princes of the Palatinate
Royalist military personnel of the English Civil War
Military personnel from Brandenburg
Sons of kings